The Asociación Empresarial ASLE (ASLE) is a not for profit association that promotes and supports employee-owned companies in the Basque Country (Euskadi), particularly using the sociedad laboral model.  The name ASLE derives from ‘Agrupación de Sociedades Laborales De Euskadi’.

Txemi Cantera International Social Economy Prize 
ASLE awards the Txemi Cantera International Social Economy Prize annually to an individual or organisation that has made a significant contribution to upholding the values that define employee-owned companies, such as participation, democracy and solidarity. The prize has been awarded since 1991 in memory of Jose Miguel Cantera Sojo, nicknamed Txemi, an economist and adviser to ASLE. Each winner receives a sculpture created by Agustin Ibarrola.

Prize winners include:
 1991: CICOPA
 1992: ALFONSO GORROÑOGOITIA
 1993: GUIVAT HAVIVA 
 1994: UNIVERSIDAD DE DEUSTO
 1995: UNITED AIRLINES 
 1996: JOSE Mª ORMAETXEA   /   JESUS LARRAÑAGA
 1997: UTAN GRÄNSER   
 1998: JOSE ESPRIU
 1999: FUNDACION SOCIAL DE BOGOTÁ
 2000: IRIZAR, S.COOP.
 2001: FUNDACION DEL EMPRESARIADO CHIHUAHUENSE
 2002: ONCE
 2003: FONDO ECUATORIANO POPULORUM PROGRESSIO   
 2004: BEROHI, S.COOP.
 2005: FORMULA SERVIZI
 2006: AUTOESCUELA LAGUNAK, S.A.L.  
 2007: Actuar Famiempresa.
2008: Rafael Calvo Ortega.
2009: Corey Rosen.
2010: Lantegi Batuak and Gureak.
2011: Tullis Russell.
 2012: José Luis Monzón and Heroslam, S.A.L.
 2013: Golder Associates.
 2014: Orona (part of the Mondragon Corporation).
 2015: Antonio Polo de Salinas de Guaranda.
 2016: FMD Carbide, S.A.L. and Gráficas Zamudio Printek, S.A.L.
 2017: Voestalpine.
 2018: KL katealegaia S.L.L.
 2019: SRC Holdings Corporation. 
 2020: Josetxo Hernández.
 ''2021: Graeme Nuttall

References

External links 
 Corporate website

Non-profit organisations based in Spain